Ocheyedan Township is a township in 
Osceola County, Iowa, USA.

References

Osceola County, Iowa
Townships in Iowa